Julian Anthony Altobelli (born November 4, 2002) is a Canadian professional soccer player who plays as an midfielder for Toronto FC II.

Early life
Altobelli was born in Toronto and grew up in Bolton, Ontario, where he played for local club Bolton Wanderers SC. He later moved with his family to Vaughan, where he played for youth teams of Vaughan Azzurri and Woodbridge Strikers. He later joined the Toronto FC Academy in 2014.

Club career
After posting a highlight reel on Instagram, he caught the attention of his future player agent, who informed him that Canadian Premier League club York9 was interested in him. After feeling the opportunities at Toronto FC lacking, he left the club's academy and signed with York9 on May 13, 2020, with options until 2023, becoming the club's youngest ever signing. After not making any appearances in the 2020 CPL season, he requested and was granted his release from the club.

In December 2020, he returned to the TFC system, signing with Toronto FC II of USL League One for the 2021 season. He made his debut on May 26, coming on as a substitute against FC Tucson. He scored his first goal on June 19, against Fort Lauderdale CF.

International career
Altobelli has represented the Canada U17 team at the 2019 CONCACAF U-17 Championship and the 2019 FIFA U-17 World Cup. He scored in a penalty kick shootout victory against Costa Rica U17 in the quarter-finals of the CONCACAF tournament which qualified the team for the U17 World Cup.

Career statistics

References

2002 births
Living people
Association football midfielders
Canadian soccer players
Soccer players from Toronto
Canadian sportspeople of Italian descent
Toronto FC players
York United FC players
Canada men's youth international soccer players
Toronto FC II players
Vaughan Azzurri players
MLS Next Pro players
USL League One players